Big Ben Phonogram is a British record label established in 1983 by Ben Hedenberg and Henrik Hallén. Its Swedish label was established in late 1983.

The company launched a classical music label in 1983 and profiled itself in works often previously not recorded. The business is continued in London by the composer Marcus Hedenberg.

During the 1980s, Big Ben had contracts with many big stars, such as Yehudi Menuhin, Christoph Eschenbach, Justus Frantz, and Inga Nielsen.

Big Ben launched in the 1980s the recording technology "The Mirror of the True Sound", which was highly regarded among audiophiles.

References

British record labels
Classical music record labels
1983 establishments in the United Kingdom
Record labels established in 1983